Vaniko Tarkhnishvili (also known as Vano Tarkhnishvili; born 9 October 1981 in Tbilisi) is a Georgian actor, director and TV presenter.

Filmography

Theatre parts
Pygmalion
Bakula’s Pigs
Our Small City
National Hymn
Tartuffe

Movie parts
Listen To Chopin
Delirium
Girls and Boys
Chifsebis Taoba
Our Office
Tbilisiuri Love Story
Rats Kvelaze Dzalian Gikvars
Rats Kvelaze Dzalian Gikvars 2
Born in Georgia

TV series parts
My Wife's Girlfriends

Other
From February 1, 2010 he is hosting Nichieri (ნიჭიერი, Georgian version of Got Talent) with Tika Patsatsia.

References

External links
 

1981 births
Living people
21st-century male actors from Georgia (country)
Actors from Tbilisi
Male stage actors from Georgia (country)
Male film actors from Georgia (country)